John Adams High School may refer to:

 John Adams High School (Indiana), a public high school in South Bend, Indiana
 John Adams High School (Ohio), a public high school located on the east side of Cleveland, Ohio
 John Adams High School (Queens), a public high school in the Ozone Park neighborhood of Queens, New York City
 Adams High School (Portland, Oregon), a public high school in Portland, Oregon

See also
 Adams High School (disambiguation)